The men's team sepak takraw competition at the 2002 Asian Games in Busan was held from 2 October to 6 October at the Minseok Sports Center in Dongseo University.

Squads

Results 
All times are Korea Standard Time (UTC+09:00)

Preliminary round

Group A

|-
|rowspan=2|2 October||rowspan=2|10:00
|rowspan=2 align=right|
|rowspan=2 align=center|0–3
|rowspan=2 align=left|
|colspan=3|0–2||colspan=3|0–2||colspan=3|0–2
|-
|11–21||8–21|| ||6–21||14–21|| ||9–21||9–21||
|-
|rowspan=2|3 October||rowspan=2|10:00
|rowspan=2 align=right|
|rowspan=2 align=center|0–3
|rowspan=2 align=left|
|colspan=3|0–2||colspan=3|0–2||colspan=3|0–2
|-
|7–21||15–21|| ||9–21||10–21|| ||9–21||9–21||
|-
|rowspan=2|4 October||rowspan=2|10:00
|rowspan=2 align=right|
|rowspan=2 align=center|3–0
|rowspan=2 align=left|
|colspan=3|2–1||colspan=3|2–1||colspan=3|2–0
|-
|15–21||21–18||15–13||21–16||24–25||15–8||21–16||21–18||

Group B

|-
|rowspan=2|2 October||rowspan=2|13:00
|rowspan=2 align=right|
|rowspan=2 align=center|3–0
|rowspan=2 align=left|
|colspan=3|2–1||colspan=3|2–0||colspan=3|2–0
|-
|21–14||17–21||15–13||21–18||21–16|| ||21–12||21–16||
|-
|rowspan=2|3 October||rowspan=2|13:00
|rowspan=2 align=right|
|rowspan=2 align=center|0–3
|rowspan=2 align=left|
|colspan=3|1–2||colspan=3|0–2||colspan=3|0–2
|-
|11–21||21–19||10–15||17–21||8–21|| ||15–21||13–21||
|-
|rowspan=2|4 October||rowspan=2|13:00
|rowspan=2 align=right|
|rowspan=2 align=center|0–2
|rowspan=2 align=left|
|colspan=3|0–2||colspan=3|1–2||colspan=3|
|-
|18–21||12–21|| ||22–20||12–21||6–15|| || ||

Knockout round

Semifinals

|-
|rowspan=2|4 October||rowspan=2|16:00
|rowspan=2 align=right|
|rowspan=2 align=center|0–2
|rowspan=2 align=left|
|colspan=3|0–2||colspan=3|0–2||colspan=3|
|-
|13–21||14–21|| ||17–21||14–21|| || || ||
|-
|rowspan=2|5 October||rowspan=2|10:00
|rowspan=2 align=right|
|rowspan=2 align=center|0–3
|rowspan=2 align=left|
|colspan=3|0–2||colspan=3|0–2||colspan=3|0–2
|-
|19–21||16–21|| ||15–21||10–21|| ||8–21||13–21||

Final

|-
|rowspan=2|6 October||rowspan=2|10:00
|rowspan=2 align=right|
|rowspan=2 align=center|0–2
|rowspan=2 align=left|
|colspan=3|0–2||colspan=3|0–2||colspan=3|
|-
|17–21||8–21|| ||10–21||14–21|| || || ||

References 

Official Website
2002 Asian Games Official Report, Page 589

Sepak takraw at the 2002 Asian Games